Superman's Metropolis is a DC Comics comic book and a Superman Elseworlds publication. It is the first part of a trilogy based on German Expressionist cinema, succeeded by Batman: Nosferatu and Wonder Woman: The Blue Amazon. It was written by Jean-Marc Lofficier, Randy Lofficier and Roy Thomas and illustrated by Ted McKeever. 

The story of Superman's Metropolis is "patterned" after Fritz Lang's classic film Metropolis, which had, in fact, been the inspiration for the city of the same name in the Superman canon.

Characters
DC characters which appear in the story (in order of appearance):

 Clarc Kent-son/the Super-Man
 Lana Lang
 Lois Lane
 Perry White
 Jon Kent
 Jimmy Ol-son
 William Hender-son
 Lutor
 Marta
 Dan Turpin
 Futura

Plot
In an undetermined future, the giant city of Metropolis is starkly divided between upper classes who live in luxury and the lower classes who toil under harsh conditions to maintain their wealth. Clarc Kent-son, son of Jon Kent, the Great Architect and apparent Master of Metropolis, becomes aware of Metropolis' social inequality after meeting Lois Lane, a teacher from the undercity. He joins the workers to experience their daily lives, then begs his father to improve their lot only to find that the Great Architect is unwilling to listen. In reality, the city is in thrall to the evil scientist Lutor, an old colleague of Jon Kent from the "time of smoke and soot" that came before the founding of Metropolis. Both Jon and Lutor fell in love with the same woman, Marta. When she chose Jon over Lutor, the scientist killed her, then used advanced hypnosis to turn Jon into a puppet who would allow Lutor to rule Metropolis from the shadows.

Concerned about a potential revolution, Lutor identifies Lois Lane as a leader who prophesies the coming of a savior who will unify Metropolis. Lutor captures Lois and creates a robotic duplicate named Futura that will lead the workers to their doom. Meanwhile, Clarc discovers that he was a foundling adopted by Jon and Marta after he was found in a capsule that fell from the sky, and that Lutor (who discovered his powers while trying-and failing-to kill him along with his mother) erased his memories and made him believe he was human, turning him into a social drone like all the other wealthy inhabitants of the city.

As Futura, disguised as Lois, leads the workers to their deaths at the hands of Lutor's soldiers, Clarc, the "Super-Man", the prophesied savior of Metropolis, intervenes. He fights Futura and destroys her by throwing her into a tank of molten metal. Lutor then reveals his half human/half mechanical body, which is powered by a mysterious green stone in the place where his heart would be. He kills Jon Kent who manages to snap out of his trance long enough to sacrifice his life for Clarc. Lutor is then killed by Clarc after a fierce battle. Clarc and Lois become the new, enlightened rulers of a reunited Metropolis.

Publication
 Superman's Metropolis (64 pages, 1996)

Trilogy
This is the first part of a trilogy:

Superman's Metropolis
Batman: Nosferatu
Wonder Woman: The Blue Amazon

Writer Jean-Marc Lofficier had a fourth and final book planned, entitled The Green Light, which would have introduced counterparts of Green Lantern, the Flash and the Martian Manhunter (based on Leni Riefenstahl's Das Blaue Licht (U.S. title: The Blue Light (1932)) and Arnold Fanck's Der Weiße Rausch - Der Neue Wunder des Schneeschuhs (U.S. title: The White Ecstasy (1931)) (which also starred Leni Riefenstahl)) and a female version of Aquaman (based on Georg Wilhelm Pabst's Die Herrin von Atlantis (U.S. title: The Mistress of Atlantis (1932)). The book would have dealt with the rediscovery of Earth, but it was never published and remains so to this day.

Trivia
 The city that Superman protects was actually named after the 1927 silent film Metropolis.
 In the original script for Metropolis, the name of the robot was Futura. The fact that the robot in the story is named Futura is an inside joke referring to the film.
 This universe was designated as a former part of the DC Multiverse called the universe of Earth-1927 in the hardcover book Absolute Crisis On Infinite Earths.
 There has been no report yet of Earth-1927 appearing as one of the 52 Earths in the new DC Multiverse. Although it might exist somewhere with the restoration of the infinite Multiverse following Convergence.

See also
 List of Elseworlds publications

References

External links
The Lofficiers' page on Superman's Metropolis

Comics by Roy Thomas
Elseworlds titles
DC Comics limited series
Superman titles
1996 comics debuts
Works based on Metropolis (1927 film)